Brigadier Edmund Charles Wolf Myers,  (12 October 1906 – 6 December 1997) was a British Army officer who fought in the Second World War. Myers was an officer in the Royal Engineers.

Military career
From October 1942 to early 1944, brevetted first to colonel and then to brigadier, Myers headed the SOE-controlled British Military Mission to occupied Greece. In this capacity, he was directly involved in the coordination of the rival ELAS and EDES partisan groups for the destruction of the Gorgopotamos viaduct in November 1942 (Operation Harling), and for the British destruction of the Asopos railway bridge on 21 June 1943 as part of Operation Animals. Increasingly drawn into the brewing conflict between the Communist-dominated ELAS and the republican EDES, as well as into British designs to restore the unpopular Greek monarchy postwar, Myers was criticised by the Foreign Office for what they believed to be favourable treatment towards ELAS and he was removed from his post. He was succeeded as head of the British mission by his deputy, Chris "Monty" Woodhouse.

Being parachute-qualified, Myers then entered service as Commander Royal Engineers in the 1st Airborne Division. In this capacity he fought at the Battle of Arnhem. Myers was sent across the Rhine on 22 September 1944 to establish contact with the 1st Polish Parachute Brigade. As chief engineer officer, he was responsible for organising the Rhine crossings of the Poles, and finally the evacuation of the remnants of the 1st Airborne Division from Arnhem. During this operation, he was wounded by shrapnel. For his part in the battle, he was awarded the Dutch Bronze Lion.

In 1955, Myers published his memoirs from his time in occupied Greece under the title Greek Entanglement.

References

External links
Lieutenant-Colonel Edmund Charles Wolf Myers, from the Pegasus Archive
1st British Airborne Division officers
Generals of World War II

1906 births
1997 deaths
British Army personnel of the Korean War
British Army brigadiers of World War II
British military personnel of the 1936–1939 Arab revolt in Palestine
British Special Operations Executive personnel
Commanders of the Order of the British Empire
Companions of the Distinguished Service Order
Foreign recipients of the Legion of Merit
Graduates of the Royal Military Academy, Woolwich
Greece in World War II
Greek Resistance members
People educated at Haileybury and Imperial Service College
People from Kensington
Recipients of the Bronze Lion
Recipients of the Legion of Merit
Military personnel from London
Graduates of the Staff College, Camberley
Royal Engineers officers